Little Iskut may refer to:

Little Iskut (British Columbia), a geologic feature in British Columbia, Canada
Little Iskut River, a river in British Columbia, Canada